Daniel Atkinson (born 15 January 2001) is an Italy international rugby league footballer who plays as a  or  for the Cronulla-Sutherland Sharks in the National Rugby League (NRL).

He previously played for the Melbourne Storm in the NRL.

Early life
Atkinson was born in Brisbane, Queensland and was educated at St Joseph's College, Nudgee. Atkinson is of Italian descent.

He played junior rugby league for the Albany Creek Crushers, before signing with Norths Devils in the Queensland Cup Colts competition in 2019.

Playing career

Early career

Ahead of the 2020 season, Atkinson was signed by the Melbourne Storm to a development contract and allocated to play for the Brisbane Tigers, making his Tigers' debut in the opening game of the 2021 Queensland Cup season.

Atkinson also played a number of games for the Victorian Thunderbolts in the Jersey Flegg Cup.

Melbourne Storm
In round 25 of the 2021 NRL season, Atkinson made his debut off the bench for Melbourne against Cronulla-Sutherland Sharks where they won 28–16. He had his Melbourne jersey (cap number 216) presented to him by Melbourne Storm teammate Dale Finucane and Football Manager Frank Ponissi.

At the end of the 2021 NRL season, Atkinson was released by Melbourne. In November 2021 he signed to play with the Sunshine Coast Falcons in the Queensland Cup. He would play the entire 2022 season with the Falcons.

Cronulla-Sutherland Sharks
Atkinson has signed a contract to join the Cronulla-Sutherland Sharks squad for the 2023 NRL season.

International career
Atkinson made his international rugby league debut for Italy at the 2021 Rugby League World Cup on 16 October 2022, playing in Italy's 28–4 win over Scotland.

References

External links
Rugby League Project profile
QRL profile
18th Man profile
Italy profile

2001 births
Living people
Australian rugby league players
Italy national rugby league team players
Melbourne Storm players
Rugby league players from Brisbane
Sunshine Coast Falcons players
Eastern Suburbs Tigers players